Elen Grygorian (born 3 January 1988) is an Armenian female weightlifter. She won a silver medal at the 2011 European Weightlifting Championships. but she is disqualified afterwards.

References

External links
 
 

1988 births
Living people
Armenian female weightlifters
21st-century Armenian women